Mayo Gardens (Punjabi, Mayo Bagh) is a colonial residential colony under the administration of Pakistan Railways. It is located within union council 96 (Zaman Park) in Gulberg Tehsil of Lahore, Punjab, Pakistan.

History 
Originally the residential colony was constructed for officials of North Western State Railway during the British Raj and was populated primarily by families of British officers. Later, the neighbourhood was handed over to Pakistan Railways.

References 

Pakistan Railways
Gulberg, Lahore